Mazon station was a small Atchison, Topeka and Santa Fe Railway station in Mazon, Illinois. The station was 66 miles west of Chicago on the BNSF Southern Transcon line. It also served the Kankakee and Seneca railroad. The most famous Santa Fe trains such as the Chief, Super Chief, and El Capitan didn't stop at Mazon. The Grand Canyon Limited train numbers 123 and 124 were the only service to Mazon. Even though passenger service has long left Mazon, the building still stands and is used by BNSF maintenance workers.

Gallery

References

External links
Mazon Depot picture
Station from Google Maps Street View

Atchison, Topeka and Santa Fe Railway stations
Former railway stations in Illinois
Transportation buildings and structures in Grundy County, Illinois
1898 establishments in Illinois